Lost Blues and Other Songs by Palace Music is a compilation of singles, rarities, and live tracks recorded by Will Oldham under various permutations of the Palace name from 1993-1997. The compilation was followed by Guarapero/Lost Blues 2 (2000) and Little Lost Blues (2006).

"Ohio River Boat Song" is an adaptation of the traditional Scottish "Loch Tay Boat Song." "Horses" was originally written and performed by Sally Timms of the Mekons on her 1988 solo album Somebody's Rockin' My Dreamboat.

Track listing
 "Ohio River Boat Song"
 "Riding"
 "Valentine's Day"
 "Trudy Dies"
 "Come In"
 "Little Blue Eyes"
 "Horses"
 "Stable Will"
 "Untitled" (Live at the Lounge Ax November 17, 1994)
 "O How I Enjoy the Light"
 "Marriage"
 "West Palm Beach"
 "Gulf Shores"
 "(End Of) Traveling"
 "Lost Blues"

References

Will Oldham albums
1997 compilation albums
Drag City (record label) compilation albums